John Bingham is an Irish Gaelic footballer who plays in defence for St Mary's and the Louth county team.

He made his first championship start against Laois in the 2013 Leinster Senior Football Championship, a game which his county won, with Bingham scoring a point despite starting the game at full-back.

He also played for Donegal Boston.

References

Year of birth missing (living people)
Living people
Donegal Boston Gaelic footballers
Gaelic football backs
Louth inter-county Gaelic footballers